Christopher Lee Rios Jr. (born November 15, 1993), known professionally as Chris Rivers, is an American rapper. He is the son of the late rapper Big Pun.

Early life
Rivers is the son of Christopher Lee Rios, better known as Big Pun - who died when Rivers was six, and his wife, Liza Rios. He is the youngest of three children. He grew up in many parts of The Bronx, New York. Rivers initially started pursuing a hip hop career when he was eight and then professionally at eighteen.

Career
Chris Rivers began his music career in 2002 as a member of a group called 3 Down, consisting of himself, Ray Ray (Benzino's son), and Lil James. They released a single called "Baby Boo", featuring Brenda Russell, shortly before disbanding.

Chris Rivers has had collaborations with various artists including Wu Tang Clan, The Lox, Termanology, Tony Sunshine, Vinnie Paz, Chino XL, Joell Ortiz, Canibus, and Cormega. He was originally known as Baby Pun. His style is said to be similar to that of his father.

Discography 
 Wonderland of Misery (2013)
 Wonderland of Misery 2: The Good King (2014)
 The Good King EP (2014)
 Medicated Consumption (2016)
 Medicated Consumption 2.0: The Refill (2016)
 Delorean (2017)
 G.I.T.U. (2019)

References

Living people
1993 births
Singers from New York (state)
American people of Puerto Rican descent
Hispanic and Latino American rappers
Rappers from the Bronx
21st-century American rappers